Francisco Pacheco del Río (bap. 3 November 1564 – 27 November 1644) was a Spanish painter, best known as the teacher and father-in-law of Diego Velázquez and Alonzo Cano, and for his textbook on painting, entitled Art of Painting, that is an important source for the study of 17th-century practice in Spain. He is described by some as the "Vasari of Seville": vocal and didactic about his theories of painting and thoughts about painters, conventional and uninspired in his executions.

Early life
He was born at Sanlúcar de Barrameda, son of Juan Pérez and wife Leonor del Río, and moved to Seville at a young age. He was a student of Luis Fernandez, and did much of his learning by copying works of the Italian masters. He visited Madrid and Toledo in 1611, studying the work of El Greco, then returned to Seville and opened an art school. He married a daughter of de Miranda and had one daughter, Juana Pacheco (1 June 1602 – 10 August 1660)

Career
Pacheco's school emphasized the academically correct representation of religious subjects, not least because he was the official censor of Seville's Inquisition. His own work reflects those constraints; paintings such as the Last Judgment (convent of Santa Isabel) and Martyrs of Granada are monumental in scale but unimaginative in treatment.

Although Velázquez was a student in Pacheco's school for six years, and married Pacheco's daughter Juana on 23 April 1618, there is no trace of Pacheco's influence in the work of Velázquez besides in standards of decorum, such as depictions of the Immaculate Conception.

In addition to material on iconography, materials and technique, Pacheco's Arte de la pintura (1649) includes valuable biographical information on Spanish painters of the time.

Gallery

References
Priscilla E. Muller, Francisco Pacheco: His development as a painter (Hispanic Society of America)

External links

Libro de descripción de verdaderos retratos de ilustres y memorables varones, Sevilla, 1599. Full images.
Work of the month. Francisco Pacheco. Ducal House of Medinaceli Foundation
Velázquez , an exhibition catalog from The Metropolitan Museum of Art (fully available online as PDF), which contains material on Pacheco (see index)
Francisco Pacheco Arte de la Pintura

1564 births
1644 deaths
Spanish Roman Catholics
16th-century Spanish painters
Spanish male painters
17th-century Spanish painters
Painters from Seville
Spanish Inquisition
People from Sanlúcar de Barrameda